Elijah Sullivan (born May 13, 1997) is an American football linebacker for the Birmingham Stallions of the United States Football League (USFL). He played college football for the Kansas State Wildcats.

Professional career

San Francisco 49ers
Sullivan was signed by the San Francisco 49ers as an undrafted free agent on May 14, 2021. He was waived on September 1, 2021 and re-signed to the practice squad, but released on September 7.

Kansas City Chiefs
On September 11, 2021, Sullivan was signed to the Kansas City Chiefs practice squad. He was released on January 18, 2022.

Jacksonville Jaguars
On February 7, 2022, Sullivan signed a reserve/future contract with the Jacksonville Jaguars. He was waived on May 2, 2022.

Birmingham Stallions
Sullivan signed with the Birmingham Stallions of the United States Football League on September 17, 2022.

References 

1997 births
Living people
American football linebackers
Kansas State Wildcats football players
San Francisco 49ers players
Kansas City Chiefs players
Jacksonville Jaguars players
Birmingham Stallions (2022) players